Baba Ziauddin Siddique is an Indian politician who was a Member of Legislative Assembly (MLA) of the state of Maharashtra in India for the Vandre West Vidhan Sabha Constituency. He was the MLA for three consecutive terms in 1999, 2004 and 2009, and had also served as a Minister of State for Food & Civil Supplies, Labour and FDA, (2004–08) and had also served as a Municipal Corporator earlier for two consecutive terms (1992–1997). He currently serves as the Chairperson & Senior Vice President of the Mumbai Regional Congress Committee & Parliamentary Board of the Maharashtra Pradesh Congress Committee .

Political career 
Ziauddin Siddique, also known as Baba Siddique, joined the Indian National Congress (INC), as a teenager, in 1977. He participated in various students' movements of the time as a member of the Mumbai chapter of the National Students Union of India – the student’s wing of the INC. He went on to become the General Secretary of the Bandra Taluka of the Bandra Youth Congress in 1980 and was elected its president within the next two years. In 1988, he became president of the Mumbai Youth Congress. Four years later he was elected a Municipal Councilor in the Mumbai Municipal Corporation and was re-elected to the position five years later. He became an MLA in 1999 from the Bandra West Assembly Constituency. He was re-elected in 2004 and 2009, thus, so far, serving three consecutive terms. Siddique was also appointed Chairman of the MHADA Mumbai Board by the Government of Maharashtra to serve from 2000-2004. He was also appointed Minister of State for Food & Civil Supplies, Labour, FDA and Consumer Protection for the Government of Maharashtra and served from 2004–2008. In 2011, he funded the creation of an Eco-Garden in Bandra-Khar.

Offices and Positions Held 
Member of the National Students Union of India (Mumbai) in (1977)
General Secretary of the Bandra Taluka of the Bandra Youth Congress in (1980)
President of the Bandra Taluka of the Bandra Youth Congress in (1982)
Municipal Councilor in the Mumbai Municipal Corporation (1993–98), (1998–2003)
Member of legislative Assembly (MLA) - (1999–2004), (2004–09) and (2009–14)
Minister of State for Food & Civil Supplies, Labour and FDA, (2004–08)
Chairman, MHADA Mumbai Board (2000-2004)
Chairperson & Senior Vice President of the Mumbai Regional Congress Committee (2014)
Parliamentary Board of the Maharashtra Pradesh Congress Committee (2019)

Personal life 
Baba Siddique is married to Shehzeen Siddique ( Alka Bindra - sister of Ranjeet Bindra who was involved in Iqbal Mirchi case ) . They have two children, a daughter Dr. Arshia Siddique and a son Zeeshan Siddique.

References

External link

People from Bandra
Indian Muslims
Maharashtra MLAs 2004–2009
Indian National Congress politicians
Living people
Year of birth missing (living people)